The Mitchell Block Historic District is a historic district in Ventura, California. The district was designated as a historic district by the City of Ventura on May 31, 1980. It was also declared eligible as a National Historic District in 1982. It has been described as "the only intact and relatively unaltered block of houses remaining downtown". The district consists of Plaza Park, the Plaza Park Moreton Bay fig tree, and eight houses in the 600 block of East Thompson Boulevard. Two of the features have been designated independently as Ventura Historic Landmarks: the Plaza Park Moreton Bay fig tree and the Conklin residence at 680 East Thompson Boulevard.

In the 1880s, Irish immigrants John, Thomas, and Edward Mitchell purchased the lots on the south side of East Thompson Boulevard and built two houses. The Mitchells sold off the remaining lots in 1904 and 1905, at which time the remaining houses were built.

Several of the properties had fallen into disrepair in the 1970s, and the district's historic designation was credited with spurring property owners to renovate and preserve the block. 

In 2007, the City's Historic Resources Group recommended limiting the historic district to the eight houses on the south side of East Thompson Boulevard and separately designating Plaza Park as a historic landmark.

Inventory of contributing properties
The properties and features included in the district are as follows:

See also
 City of Ventura Historic Landmarks and Districts

References

 

Locally designated landmarks in the United States